The Worshipful Company of Skinners (known as The Skinners' Company) is one of the Livery Companies of the City of London. It was originally an association of those engaged in the trade of skins and furs. It was granted Royal Charter in 1327.

The Company's motto is To God Only Be All Glory.

History

Under an order issued by the Lord Mayor of the City of London on 10 April 1484 (known as the Billesdon Award), the Company ranks in sixth or seventh place (making it one of the "Great Twelve City Livery Companies") in the order of precedence of City Livery Companies, alternating annually with the Merchant Taylors' Company; these livery companies have borrowed Chaucer's phrase "At sixes and sevens" to describe their rivalry over precedence – specifically which company was entitled to be 6th in order of seniority – being a source of trouble between the Skinners and the Merchant Taylors for some time in the 15th, and perhaps even 14th centuries. Both companies received their first royal charters in 1327, but the dispute erupted into lethal violence in 1484 during the Lord Mayor's river procession, an occasion which the two guilds treated as their own private boat race.  After the administration of justice to some of the offenders the then-Lord Mayor, Haberdasher Sir Robert Billesdon, mediated between the two companies at the request of their Masters, and he resolved that each company should have precedence over the other in alternate years and that each company's Master and Wardens should be invited to dine at the other's Hall every year.

The Skinners are normally sixth in the order of precedence in even numbered years, and at seven in odd numbered years, but as the Lord Mayor for 2005/6 was a member of the Merchant Taylors' company they kept precedence.  Merchant Taylors' kept precedence in 2006/7, their regular turn.

Education
In the present day the Company is an educational and charitable institution, supporting the following schools:
Tonbridge School and The Judd School in Tonbridge 
The Skinners' School Skinners Kent Primary School and The Skinners' Kent Academy in Royal Tunbridge Wells
Skinners' Academy in Hackney
Marsh Academy in Romney Marsh

See also 
 Leathersellers' Company
 Cordwainers' Company
 Curriers' Company
 Glovers' Company
 Skinner

Notes

References

External links
 The Skinners' Company

Skinners
Fur